Searsia lancea commonly known as karee (archaicly karree), is an evergreen, frost hardy, drought resistant tree, which can reach up to 8 metres in height with a 5-metre spread. It is one of the most common trees on the Highveld and in the Bushveld in South Africa, but not found in the Lowveld. In North America, where it is naturalized, it is known as African sumac and willow rhus.

Common names
S. lancea bears many names by locals in South Africa. By far the most common name for this tree is karee which derives from the 
Khoemana word !xareb (Compare Khoekhoegowab cognate |garas). This is mostly used by speakers of Afrikaans. Another Afrikaans name names known is Rosyntjiebos from rosyn (raisin)  and bos (bush).

In the Sotho–Tswana languages, the names mosilabele in Southern Sotho, mokalabata in Northern Sotho and mosabele in Tswana are cognates.

Among Nguni languages the name umhlakotshane in Zulu and Xhosa is used and in Swati the name given is inhlangutshane

Description and uses

The tree is dioecious. It has a graceful, weeping form and dark, fissured bark that contrasts well with its long, thinnish, hairless, dark-green, trifoliate leaves with smooth margins. It bears small yellow flowers followed on female trees by bunches of small yellow-green flattish fruits, which are relished by birds. In earlier times the fruits were pounded, water added and left to ferment, producing an evidently refreshing beer. The tree is a good shade tree for gardens, parks and pavements. It favours areas rich in lime in the Karoo and Namibia.

References

lancea
Trees of South Africa
Flora of Namibia
Garden plants of Southern Africa
Drought-tolerant trees
Ornamental trees